The New Zealand national under-19 basketball team is the men's basketball side that represents New Zealand in international under-18 and under-19 basketball competitions, including the FIBA Under-19 World Championship and FIBA Oceania Under-18 Championship. Nicknamed the Junior Tall Blacks, the team is governed by Basketball New Zealand. The national open men's team is called the Tall Blacks, which is one of many national team nicknames, similar to that of the All Blacks, and relating to the New Zealand silver tree fern. One of the Junior Tall Blacks' greatest accomplishments has been winning the 2016 FIBA Oceania Under-18 Championship, and therefore qualifying for the 2017 FIBA Under-19 World Championship for the first time in team history. The team did play in a 2009 FIBA Under-19 World Championship as hosts, because New Zealand hosted the event, but the team had not officially qualified for the tournament.

See also
 New Zealand men's national basketball team
 New Zealand women's national basketball team

References

External links
 Basketball New Zealand official website
 FIBA.com profile
 

under
Men's national under-19 basketball teams